Dance Revolution is the debut and only album from American girl group, The Slumber Party Girls. It was released on October 3, 2006 by Geffen Records.

Promotion
"My Life" was released on May 8, 2007 as the album's lead and only single. It is also featured in Bratz: The Movie and on its soundtrack.

Music videos for "Dance With Me", "The Texting Song", "Salsa", "Summer's Gone", "Make a Wish", "My Life", "I Got Your Back", "Carousel", "Back to Basics", "Good Times", "Countdown", "Bubblegum" and "Eavesdroppin'" were produced to promote the album. They are currently available for purchase on iTunes.

The group further promoted the album through live performances, mostly on Dance Revolution since they were the show's house band. All songs, except "The Slumber Party Girls Theme" and "Dance Revolution Theme", were performed on the show. They also made a guest appearance on The Early Show on the album's release date to promote it and performed "Countdown". During that special guest appearance, they spoke of a made-for-TV movie and television series in development, but due to the group's disbandment in the summer of 2007, those projects were cancelled.

Despite heavy promotion on the album, It failed to chart on the Billboard 200 chart or any major chart and was a commercial failure.

Critical reception
The album earned mixed reviews from music critics. Marisa Brown of AllMusic gave the album a positive review, calling it "With good beats and hooks, It's absolutely nothing that hasn't already been done a million times before, but for what it is, it's done pretty well". However, Bullz-Eye.com's Jason Thompson panned the album. criticizing it's forgettable and disposable pop sound. He also noted that none of the songs were memorable, saying "They’re all as wretched and forgettable as you would imagine they are. There is nothing here even worth making fun of in a completely base way, it’s that pointless". He gave the album zero stars out of five.

Track listing
"Countdown" (Kura, Mazza, Ridel) – 2:55
"The Texting Song (BTW, This is All 4 U)" (Crawford, Ferguson, Mischle, Ridel) – 2:56
"Bubblegum" (Emmanuel, Fair, Martin, Ridel) – 3:24
"Make a Wish" (Fair, Munson, Ridel) – 3:05
"Good Times" (Crawford, Ferguson, Louriano, Ridel) – 2:51
"I Got Your Back" (Crawford, Fair, Ferguson, Louriano, Ridel) – 3:29
"My Life" (Harris, Mazza, Ridel) – 2:50
"Dance with Me" (Fair, Mischke, Munson, Ridel) – 2:44
"Carousel" (Fair, Ridel, Scapa) – 3:26
"Salsa" (Harris, Mazza, Ridel, Sandstrom) – 3:15
"Summer's Gone" (Fair, Modesto, Ridel, Sheth) – 2:57
"Eavesdropping" (Brucculeri, Fair, Hidalgo, Kelley, Pascal, Ridel) – 3:34
"Back to Basics" (Fair, Hendricks, Ridel) – 2:46
"The Slumber Party Girls Theme" (bonus track) (Fair, Ridel) – 1:12
"Dance Revolution Theme" (bonus track) (Fair, Ridel) – 2:36

Personnel 
Charlie Bisharat – Violin (Electric)
David Brookwell – Executive Producer
Christian Brucculeri – Producer
Anthony Caruso – Assistant Engineer
Luis Conte – Percussion
Tyler Coomes – Drum Programming
Drop Squad – Producer
John Easton – Producer
Mike "Angry" Eleopoulos – Engineer
Colin Emmanuel – Producer
Ron Fair – Harmonica, Percussion, Arranger, Keyboards, Programming, Producer, Executive Producer, Vocal Arrangement, Mixing, Slide Whistle, Toy Piano
Deb Fenstermacher – Marketing
Gary Grant – Horn
Bernie Grundman – Mastering
Ron Harris – Keyboards, Producer
Ron Harris – Bass
Hylah Hedgepeth – Artist Coordination
Kyle Hendricks "Rain" – Producer
Tal Herzberg – Bass, Producer, Digital Editing
Jerry Hey – Horn, Horn Arrangements
Andy Heyward – Executive Producer
Dan Higgins – Horn
Jun Ishizeki – Engineer
Judy – Stylist
Carlene K – Make-Up
Kimberly Kelley – Guitar, Producer
Gelly Kusuma – Assistant Engineer
Mike Maliani – Executive Producer
John Marx – Representation
Anthony Mazza – Guitar, Producer
Sean McNamara – Executive Producer
Moises Modesto – Producer
Peter Mokran – Mixing
Dean Nelson – Mixing Assistant
Sheryl Nields – Photography
Jeff Norskog – Management
Dave Pensado – Mixing
Jack Joseph Puig – Mixing
Bill Reichenbach Jr. – Horn
Stefanie Ridel – Producer, Executive Producer, Vocal Arrangement
Sammy – Stylist
Nicky Scapa – Producer
Ashish Sheth – Producer
Justin Siegel – A&R
Sabrina Sweet – Make-Up
Michelle Thomas – Marketing
Eric Weaver – Mixing Assistant

References

2006 debut albums
Slumber Party Girls albums
Albums produced by Ron Fair